George Leo "Jeff" Jefferson (August 8, 1922 – September 21, 1985) was an American baseball pitcher in the Negro leagues. He played with the Jacksonville Red Caps in 1942 and 1943 and the Cleveland Buckeyes from 1944 to 1950. His brother, Bill Jefferson, also played Negro league baseball.

References

External links
 and Seamheads

1922 births
1985 deaths
Cleveland Buckeyes players
Jacksonville Red Caps players
Louisville Buckeyes players
Baseball players from Oklahoma
Sportspeople from Bartow, Florida
20th-century African-American sportspeople
Baseball pitchers